Joseph Leo O'Rourke Jr. (October 28, 1904 – June 27, 1990) was a pinch hitter in Major League Baseball. He played for the Philadelphia Phillies in 1929.

References

External links

1904 births
1990 deaths
Philadelphia Phillies players
Chicago White Sox scouts
Kansas City Athletics scouts
Philadelphia Athletics scouts
Washington Senators (1961–1971) scouts
Montreal Royals players
Richmond Roses players
Johnstown Johnnies players
Minor league baseball managers
Baseball players from Philadelphia